The West Spring Gun was a bomb-throwing catapult used by British, Canadian and Australian forces during World War I. It was designed to throw a hand grenade in a high trajectory into enemy trenches.

Description
It consisted of a metal frame supporting a throwing arm powered by 24 metal springs. It was invented by Captain Allen West in 1915 and manufactured by the Reason Manufacturing Company of Brighton, which was granted a patent for the device on 19 October of that year. Although called a catapult, it was a hybrid of a ballista and a trebuchet. It required a crew of five - three to compress the springs, one to load the bomb, and one to fire as soon as the fuse was lit or the grenade pin was pulled.

In the field it generally threw a Jam Tin Grenade, No. 15 Ball grenade, No. 21 "Spherical" grenade or No. 28 chemical grenade, equipped with a slightly longer fuse (typically 9 seconds) to ensure to reach the enemy trench before exploding. It was used in combat by, amongst others, the 50th (Northumbrian) Division and the 1st Canadian Division in the Second Battle of Ypres and by Australian forces in the Gallipoli Campaign. It was generally considered to be large and cumbersome and "generally more unwieldy" than the Leach Trench Catapult. Many operators, including Captain West himself, lost fingers in the mechanism. The throw could also be unpredictable, with the bomb sometimes landing near the thrower.

Production of this and other trench catapults was officially halted in 1916, being replaced by the 2 inch Medium Trench Mortar and Stokes mortar.

Ammunition

References

External links
 No 21 R Type grenade for the West Spring Gun at the Imperial War Museum.
 West Spring Gun (missing its launch arm) at the Australian War Memorial.

Projectile weapons
World War I British infantry weapons
Grenade launchers
Chemical weapon delivery systems